Dorstenia barteri is a West African plant species belonging to the family Moraceae.

Description
A herb, 60 cm high, with a creeping rooting base. Stem erect, somewhat fleshy, subflexuous, pubescent to tomentose in the upper portion, up to 5 cm thick in the lower portion. Leaves papery when dry, obovate-elliptic to elliptic, shortly acuminate, narrowing to an obtuse base, margin entire or wavy, 14–18 cm long, 5–8 cm wide, glabrous, paler green beneath; lateral nerves 8–10 on each side, curving upwards and uniting within the margin, prominent beneath; petiole more or less pubescent, about 1.2 cm or less in length. Stipules subulate, 5–6 cm or less in length, generally falling before the leaves. Flowers very distinct. Male flowers 3-merous, the 3 bluntly rounded perianth-lobes depressed on the surface of the disc. Female perianth ring-like, raised above the disc-surface, the deeply 2-fid style projecting from the mouth. Endocarp of fruit subglobose, smooth, whitish brown, 4 cm in diameter.

Medicinal uses
Dorstenia barteri is used in West African folk medicine. It  contains numerous flavonoid compounds that have anti-microbial, anti-reverse transcriptase, and anti-inflammatory effects.

References

barteri